The 2013 Campeonato Brasileiro de Turismo (Brazilian Touring Championship) (officially the 2013 Troféu Dolly) also known as Stock Car Brasil Light was the first season of the new Stock Car Brasil second tier championship replacing Copa Chevrolet Montana. The chassis, designed by JL company is similar that used in Stock Car Brasil with V8 engine.

Teams and drivers 
 All cars are powered by V8 engines and use JL chassis. All drivers were Brazilian-registered.

Race calendar and results 
The calendar was released on 11 February 2013. All races were held in Brazil.

Championship standings 
Points were awarded as follows:

Drivers' Championship

Teams' Championship

References

External links 
 

Campeonato Brasileiro de Turismo
Stock Car Brasil